TV Festa is an Albanian language local television channel in Kumanovo, North Macedonia.

See also
 Kumanovo

References

External links
 YouTube Channel

Television channels in North Macedonia
Mass media in Kumanovo